Romel Javier Quiñónez Suárez (born 25 June 1992) is a Bolivian footballer who plays as a goalkeeper for Oriente Petrolero and the  Bolivia national football team.

International career
As of June 2016, he has won 13 caps for the Bolivia national football team. He represented his country in 3 FIFA World Cup qualification matches.

References

External links
 
 Profile - Bolívar
 
 

1992 births
Living people
Sportspeople from Santa Cruz de la Sierra
Association football goalkeepers
Bolivian footballers
Bolivia international footballers
Club Bolívar players
2015 Copa América players